Gravesend railway station serves the town of Gravesend in north Kent, England.

Train services are operated by Southeastern and Thameslink. 
During Christmas 2013, a major overhaul of the lines and platforms changed the four track, two platform layout into two through lines and a western facing bay platform.

History 

The first railway line to arrive in Gravesend was the Gravesend & Rochester Railway (G&RR) who had purchased the Thames and Medway Canal and its tunnel between Strood and Higham. The G&RR ran the first train to the then terminus at Gravesend (adjacent to the Canal Basin) on 10 February 1845. On 30 July 1849 the line was extended to North Kent East Junction on the South Eastern Railway (SER) and thence to London Bridge.

There was a second Gravesend station (later known as Gravesend West Street then later still Gravesend West) opened by SER's rivals, London, Chatham & Dover Railway (LCDR). It was the end of a branch off the LCDR's main line and it allowed access to Victoria. Journey times were uncompetitive and, when the two companies combined in 1899, the branch was soon relegated to a secondary line and closed in 1968. To differentiate from this other station, Gravesend was named Gravesend Central for a long time.

High speed HS1 services to London St Pancras International were introduced in December 2009 and proved highly successful. The station is now seen as a major interchange for metro and high speed services. There is far greater customer patronage for high speed services to St Pancras from Gravesend in comparison to nearby Ebbsfleet International, where usage is considered modest at best. This might be due (in part) to the sizeable London-bound commuter population in and around Gravesham, as opposed to domestic passenger use at Ebbsfleet, from elsewhere in North West Kent. Additionally services between Maidstone West and London St Pancras have since been added to SouthEastern's High Speed route, which stop at Strood and Gravesend prior to joining the high speed lines at Ebbsfleet.

In 2013 a £19 million overhaul of the station, platforms and lines involved the demolition of a former water tank base on the southern platform of the station (Platform 1 at this time), the installation of a new lift/stair bridge complex towards the western end of the station, the removal of the early 20th century footbridge that spanned the lines close to the ticket halls and a major remodelling of the lines and platforms.

The station's track layout was substantially altered in December 2013. This was primarily for extending the current platforms to accommodate 12 coach trains as opposed to the previous 10 coach limit. Platform 1 has been extended and converted to a London facing bay platform and renumbered as Platform 0. A new single face central Platform 1 is located on the site of what was the former up 'through' road. Services from Medway and Faversham, including London bound high speed trains, use this platform. This new platform has bidirectional workings and capability. Platform 2 remained numbered as '2'; however, it lost its turnback capability and thus caters solely for coast bound services. Services terminating at Gravesend from London Charing Cross or London Cannon Street stations terminate on Platform 0.

The previous historic but narrow central footbridge has been replaced with a large sheltered bridge with lifts, at the London end of the station and serving all three platforms. This new bridge is at the far western end of the platforms; the previous bridge was conveniently near the centre of the platforms and near to the entry/exit.

Services 

The typical off-peak service in trains per hour is:
 1 tph to London St Pancras International
 2 tph to London Charing Cross via 
 2 tph to London Cannon Street via  and 
 2 tph to  via Woolwich Arsenal and 
 2 tph to 
 1 tph to  via 

References

External links 

Gravesend, Kent
Railway stations in Kent
DfT Category C2 stations
Former South Eastern Railway (UK) stations
Railway stations in Great Britain opened in 1849
Railway stations served by Southeastern
1849 establishments in England
Railway stations served by Govia Thameslink Railway